The Local Hero Award is a part of the Australian of the Year awards.  It commenced in 2003 and is sponsored by the Department of Immigration and Citizenship (DIAC).

The Local Hero Award acknowledges extraordinary contributions made by Australians in their local community.  A Local Hero from each state and territory is chosen each year, with one of the eight state and territory Local Heroes announced as Australia's Local Hero on Australia Day eve each year.

List of award recipients

See also
 List of Australian of the Year Award recipients
 List of Senior Australian of the Year Award recipients
 List of Young Australian of the Year Award recipients

References

External links 
 Australia's Local Hero award

Australian Local Hero Award recipients
Awards established in 2003